The 1973 Stanford Cardinals football team represented Stanford University in the Pacific-8 Conference during the 1973 NCAA Division I football season. Led by second-year head coach Jack Christiansen, the Cardinals were 7–4 overall (5–2 in Pac-8, third) and played home games on campus at Stanford Stadium in Stanford, California. The Pac-8 did not allow a second bowl team until the 1975 season.

Schedule

Roster

Game summaries

Penn State

Michigan

San Jose State

Illinois

UCLA

Washington

Washington State

Oregon State

USC

Oregon

California

Junior running back Scott Laidlaw gained 132 yards on 23 carries while Rod Garcia finished his career with 42 field goals, and NCAA record, and 18 for the season, which tied the NCAA record. Stanford played most of the second half without starting quarterback Mike Boryla, who left the game with a bruised throwing arm.

All-conference

Five Stanford players were named to the All-Pac-8 team: quarterback Mike Boryla, wide receiver Bill Singler, defensive tackle Roger Stillwell, safety Randy Poltl, and kicker Rod Garcia; Singler and Stillwell were juniors.

NFL Draft
Six Stanford seniors were selected in the 1974 NFL Draft.
List of Stanford Cardinal in the NFL Draft

References

Stanford
Stanford Cardinal football seasons
Stanford Cardinals football